Aleksandr Fedoseyevich Zasukhin (15 July 1928 – 15 August 2012) was a Soviet boxer who won two silver medals at the European championships of 1953 and 1955. He competed at the 1952 Olympics, but was eliminated in the second bout. During his career Zasukhin won four national titles (1950, 1954, 1956, 1957) and 165 bouts out of 185.

Zasukhin graduated from the Krasnodar Institute of Physical Education, where he defended a PhD in pedagogy and became professor. In the 1960s he moved to Perm, and later worked as a boxing coach in Bulgaria. His younger brother Aleksei also won a European silver medal in boxing.

References

1928 births
2012 deaths
Olympic boxers of the Soviet Union
Boxers at the 1952 Summer Olympics
Russian male boxers
Lightweight boxers
Sportspeople from Yekaterinburg